HC Leipzig is a women's handball club based in Leipzig, Germany. They play in Handball-Bundesliga Frauen and are often competing in the EHF Women's Champions League,  the now defunct EHF Women's Cup Winners' Cup, which merged with the Women's EHF Cup and are internationally regarded as one of the best German women's handball clubs.

Kits

Honours

Domestic competitions
Handball-Bundesliga Frauen:
 Champions (6): 1998, 1999, 2002, 2006, 2009, 2010
German Cup:
 Winners (7): 1996, 2000, 2006, 2007, 2008, 2014, 2016
German Supercup:
 Winners (1): 2008
DDR-Oberliga:
 Champions (15): 1953, 1957, 1965, 1968, 1969, 1970, 1971, 1972, 1973, 1975, 1976, 1978, 1984, 1988, 1991
FDGB-Pokal:
 Winners (3): 1971, 1983, 1987

European competitions
 EHF Women's Champions League:
 Winners (2): 1966, 1974
 Runners-Up (4): 1967, 1970, 1972, 1977
 EHF Women's Cup Winners' Cup:
 Runners-Up (2): 1978, 1997
 Women's EHF Cup:
 Winners (2): 1986, 1992
 Runners-Up (1): 2009

European record

Team

Current squad
Squad for the 2021–22 season

Goalkeeper 

 16 Anna Kröber
 26 Annabell Krüeger

Fields 

 2 Pauline Uhlmann
 3 Lara Seidel
 7 Julia Weise
 10 Emely Theilig
 14 Hanna Ferber-Rahnhöfer
 20 Sharleen Greschner
 22 Emily Glimm
 23 Tyra Bessert
 24 Lotta Röpcke
 25 Lilli Röpcke
 33 Christin Conrad
 36 Stefanie Hummel
 35 Jacqueline Hummel
 41 Wiebke Meyer
 99 Nina Reißberg

Technical Staff 
 Club Manager: Torsten Brunnquell
 Head Coach: Fabian Kunze
 Assistant Coach: Philip Brommann
 Goalkeeping Coach: Wieland Schmidt
 Physiotherapist: Sophie Höpfner

Squad for the 2017–18 season

Goalkeeper
 12  Helen Keller
 16  Anna Kröber
 28  Anja Kreitzick
Fields
 2  Pauline Uhrmann
 3  Anna Ansorge
 5  Isabell Hurst
 6  Celina Matthey
 7  Julia Weise
 8  Beatrix Kerestely

 9  Antonia Herzig
 10  Emely Thellig
 13  Anna Lena Plate
 15  Johanna Schierbok
 17  Lea Guderian
 20  Sharleen Greschner
 22  Lucie-Marie Kretzschmar
 23  Francisca Buth
 25  Lilli Röpcke
 27  Leonie Rauschenbach

Technical staff
 Club Manager: Kay-Sven Hähner
 Head Coach:  Norman Rentsch
 Assistant Coach: Max Berthold
 Goalkeeping Coach: Wieland Schmidt
 Fitness and Athletics Coach: Isabelle Kellmann
 Physiotherapist: Christian Markus
 Physiotherapist: Danilo Menge
 Team Doctor: Dr. Gotthard Knoll

Notable former players
  Natalie Augsburg
  Nora Reiche
  Ulrike Stange
  Katja Schülke
 Luisa Schulze
 Susann Müller
 Anne Müller
 Katja Langkeit
 Nina Müller
 Grit Jurack
 Anne Hubinger
 Saskia Lang
 Franziska Mietzner
 Shenia Minevskaja
 Sara Eriksson
 Sara Holmgren
 Karolina Kudlacz
 Karolina Szwed
 Debbie Bont
 Maura Visser
 Jessy Kramer
 Rikke Nielsen
 Louise Lyksborg
 Chana Masson
 Idalina Borges Mesquita
 Else Marthe Sörlie Lybekk
 Renate Urne
 Ionica Munteanu

References

External links
 

German handball clubs
Sport in Leipzig
Handball clubs established in 1893
Women's handball clubs
Women's handball in Germany
1893 establishments in Germany